is railway station on the Kyūdai Main Line operated by JR Kyushu in Kurume, Fukuoka Prefecture, Japan.

Lines 
Only local trains on the line stop at the station.

Layout 
The station consists of two side platforms serving two tracks on a low embankment. The station building is a shed of simple modern design and is unstaffed, serving only to house a waiting area and an automatic ticket vending machine. Access to the opposite side platform is by means of a level crossing with ramps.

Adjacent stations

History
Mii was opened on the same day as one of several intermediate stations on the track. With the privatization of Japanese National Railways (JNR), the successor of JGR, on 1 April 1987, JR Kyushu took over control of the station.

Passenger statistics
In fiscal 2015, there were 97,000 boarding passengers (in rounded thousands), giving a daily average of 265 passengers.

References

External links
Mii (JR Kyushu)

Railway stations in Fukuoka Prefecture
Railway stations in Japan opened in 1928